Lalubha Jadeja (30 August 1922 – 19 July 2015) was an Indian cricketer. He played first-class cricket for Saurashtra and Services.

References

External links
 

1922 births
2015 deaths
Indian cricketers
Nawanagar cricketers
Saurashtra cricketers
Services cricketers
Cricketers from Gujarat